Qapıçıməhəllə is a village and municipality in the Astara Rayon of Azerbaijan. It has a population of 598.

References

Populated places in Astara District